André St. Laurent (born February 16, 1953) is a Canadian former professional ice hockey forward. He played in the National Hockey League 1973 and 1983 with four teams. He also plater played several seasons in Europe, finishing his career in 1990.

Playing career
Born in Rouyn-Noranda, Quebec, St. Laurent started his National Hockey League career with the New York Islanders in 1974. He also played for the Detroit Red Wings, Los Angeles Kings, and Pittsburgh Penguins. He left the NHL after the 1984 season. He played the 1985 season for the Adirondack Red Wings. In the 1985–86 and 1986–87 seasons he played for Rögle BK in Sweden and later played in France for Rouen, Clermont and Bordeaux.

Career statistics

Regular season and playoffs

External links 
 

1953 births
Living people
Adirondack Red Wings players
Boxers de Bordeaux players
Canadian expatriate ice hockey players in Sweden
Canadian ice hockey centres
Detroit Red Wings players
Fort Worth Texans players
Fort Worth Wings players
Houston Apollos players
Ice hockey people from Quebec
Los Angeles Kings players
Montreal Bleu Blanc Rouge players
Montreal Junior Canadiens players
New Haven Nighthawks players
New York Islanders draft picks
New York Islanders players
Pittsburgh Penguins players
Rögle BK players
Rouen HE 76 players
Sportspeople from Rouyn-Noranda
Vancouver Blazers draft picks